Derek Longmuir (born 19 March 1951, Edinburgh, Scotland) is a Scottish former drummer and a founding member of the 1970s pop group, Bay City Rollers. His elder brother, Alan Longmuir, played bass guitar in the group.

Biography
Longmuir was born at Simpson Memorial Maternity Pavilion Hospital, in Edinburgh. He appeared on each of the band's nine studio albums through to 1981. He retired from the music industry in the early 1980s and trained as a nurse working at Edinburgh Royal Infirmary.

In 2000, Longmuir was sentenced to 300 hours' community service after admitting to possessing child pornography. Despite his guilty plea, he maintained that the offending materials did not belong to him but were left behind by an acquaintance. Longmuir said he pleaded guilty in hope of avoiding a "media circus". Despite his conviction and initially being suspended from working as a nurse, the conduct committee of the United Kingdom Central Council for Nursing Midwifery and Health Visiting (UKCC) decided to give him a caution and allowed him to continue working as a nurse.

In an interview in the Sunday Herald on 7 May 2000, Longmuir's foster son, Jorge Loureiro, said that Longmuir was innocent and had been framed by an obsessed American fan he had befriended, with discs having been sent to his home anonymously days before he was arrested.

References

Bibliography
 Stambler, Irwin, Encyclopedia of Pop, Rock & Soul. 1974. St. Martin's Press, Inc., New York, N.Y. .

1951 births
Scottish nurses
Living people
Musicians from Edinburgh
20th-century Scottish criminals
Scottish rock drummers
British male drummers
Bay City Rollers members
Scottish people convicted of child pornography offenses
Criminals from Edinburgh